Christopher "Chris" Collins (born 25 January 1960) is retired male amateur boxer from Grenada who fought at the 1984 Summer Olympics in the men's Middleweight division, and later at the 1988 Summer Olympics as a Light Heavyweight. He represented Grenada at the 1987 Pan American Games.

1984 Olympic results
Below is the record of Chris Collins, a middleweight boxer from Grenada who competed at the 1984 Los Angeles Olympics:
 
 Round of 32: lost to Paulo Tuvale (Samoa) referee stopped contest in the first round

References

Grenadian male boxers
Living people
Middleweight boxers
Light-heavyweight boxers
Boxers at the 1984 Summer Olympics
Boxers at the 1988 Summer Olympics
Olympic boxers of Grenada
Boxers at the 1987 Pan American Games
Pan American Games competitors for Grenada
1960 births